Senaithalaivar is a Tamil-speaking caste mainly from south Tamil Nadu. They are also known by the names Senaikudiyar, Ilaivaniar.And they use the title Pillai,Mudhaliyar, Chettiar and. Moopanar .

Literary evidence
The original name of these people is said to be Ilai Vaniyar Or Senaiyar.  The earliest literary evidence about the word Senaithalaivar occurs in Adhi Diwakaram, a Tamil lexicon written by Sendan Diwakarar. They are warriors of chola kingdom . It meant the profession of Senaithalaivar (commander-in-chief)

Distribution
They are mainly populated in Tirunelveli District, Tiruvarur District , Chennai , Kanyakumari District, Nagapattinam District, Thanjaur District and Madurai District. including places like Tenmalai, Kayatharu and Seevalapperi. T

Society and caste organisation
They are included in the Tamil Nadu state's list of Backward castes.

References

Social groups of Tamil Nadu